The Manipur bush quail (Perdicula manipurensis) is a species of quail found in northeastern India and Bangladesh inhabiting damp grassland, particularly stands of tall grass. It was first collected and described by Allan Octavian Hume on an ornithological expedition to Manipur in 1881.

P. manipurensis is listed as Endangered on the IUCN's Red List, as its habitat is small, fragmented, and rapidly shrinking.

There was no confirmed sighting of the bird from 1932 until June 2006, when Anwaruddin Choudhury reported spotting the quail in Assam.

BBC News quoted the conservation director of the Wildlife Trust of India, Rahul Kaul, as saying, "This creature has almost literally returned from the dead."

History 
A 1911 report by Frank Finn, based on Captain Wood's field notes of 1899, noted that the species was common in the past. Wood noted that the bird was commonly trapped by Manipur people after bush fires and that the local name was lanz-soibol meaning "trap quail".

Gallery

References

Manipur bush quail
Manipur bush quail
Birds of Northeast India
Manipur bush quail